Christmas Knob is a summit located in Central New York Region of New York located in the Town of Kirkland, north of Clinton.

References

Mountains of Oneida County, New York
Mountains of New York (state)